The 1964 Currie Cup was the 28th edition of the Currie Cup, the premier domestic rugby union competition in South Africa.

See also

 Currie Cup

References

1964
1964 in South African rugby union
Currie